Antony 'Ant' Ringer (born 1966) is a male British sport shooter.

Sport shooting career
He represented England and won a silver medal in the fullbore rifle, at the 1994 Commonwealth Games in Victoria, British Columbia, Canada. Four years later he once again represented England in the fullbore rifle events, at the 1998 Commonwealth Games in Kuala Lumpur, Malaysia.

References

1966 births
Living people
British male sport shooters
Commonwealth Games medallists in shooting
Commonwealth Games silver medallists for England
Shooters at the 1994 Commonwealth Games
Shooters at the 1998 Commonwealth Games
Medallists at the 1994 Commonwealth Games